Six Pence for the Sauces was the second and last record released by Drake Tungsten. The five-song EP included two future Spoon tracks, as well as a Pixies cover. 1996 marked the end of Drake Tungsten, as well as the birth of Spoon - the musical group that Britt Daniel has performed with post-Tungsten.

Track listing
 "Do the Manta Ray" - 2:12
 "Cool It You Need" - 3:52
 "Chicago at Night" - 3:17
 "He Was Soon To Undergo an Experience for which his Long Training as an Aristocrat, a Gentleman, and an Officer Had Scarcely Prepared Him" - 1:09
 "I Could Be Underground" - 1:14

Notes
 "Do the Manta Ray" is an instrumental Pixies cover of "Dancing the Manta Ray", which appears as a B-side on the "Monkey Gone To Heaven" single.
 "Chicago at Night" was later re-recorded and re-released on Spoon's third LP, Girls Can Tell.
 "I Could Be Underground" was later re-recorded and re-released on Spoon's 30 Gallon Tank EP.

References

External links

 Peek-A-Boo Records: Drake Tungsten page
 Spoon Official Website

1996 EPs
Peek-A-Boo Records EPs